Jack Horsell (12 July 1914 – 20 April 1985) was an Australian cricketer. He played in two first-class matches for South Australia between 1937 and 1939.

See also
 List of South Australian representative cricketers

References

External links
 

1914 births
1985 deaths
Australian cricketers
South Australia cricketers
Cricketers from Adelaide